Seimone Delicia Augustus (born April 30, 1984) is an American former professional basketball player who is an assistant coach for the Los Angeles Sparks of the Women's National Basketball Association (WNBA).  She was drafted first overall by the Minnesota Lynx in the 2006 draft, but for her final season in 2020 with the Sparks, played her entire career with Minnesota. An eight-time All-Star and the 2008 finals MVP, Augustus lead the Lynx to four WNBA championships.  Augustus is one of the most recognizable faces in the WNBA.

In addition to the WNBA, she played the U.S. national team and overseas for Dynamo Kursk.

In 2020, she retired as a player and became a Sparks assistant coach for the 2021 season.

Early years
Augustus was born in Baton Rouge, Louisiana; she is the daughter of Seymore and Kim Augustus.

Before her freshman year in high school, Augustus was featured on the cover of Sports Illustrated for Women, with a headline that asked, "Is She the Next Michael Jordan?" Augustus played for Capitol High School in Baton Rouge, Louisiana, where she was named a WBCA All-American. She participated in the 2002 WBCA High School All-America Game where she scored fourteen points, and earned MVP honors.

College career

During her collegiate career with the LSU Lady Tigers, the two-time All-American won the Naismith College Player of the Year, Wooden Award and Wade Trophy in 2005 and 2006 while leading the LSU to three straight Final Four appearances. The Lady Tigers however, never advanced beyond the semi-final round.  She averaged 19.3 points, 5.2 rebounds and 2 assists per game in her collegiate career. During her final year, she won the Lowe's Senior CLASS Award, recognizing her as the nation's top senior women's basketball player. Augustus graduated from Louisiana State University in 2006. Her uniform number (33) was retired by LSU on January 9, 2010, making her the first female athlete in school history to receive that honor. In January 2023, she became the first female athlete in school history to have a statue of her on the school campus; that statue is in front of the school’s basketball training center next to statues of Bob Pettit, Shaquille O'Neal, and Pete Maravich, who also played for LSU.

Augustus also played with future WNBA teammate Sylvia Fowles during her collegiate career at LSU.

College statistics
Source

WNBA career

2006–2008: Personal Success, Team Failure
Augustus was drafted No. 1 overall in 2006 WNBA Draft by the Minnesota Lynx. Selected as a reserve for the 2006 WNBA All Star Game at Madison Square Garden, Augustus led the West squad with 16 points and won the Skills Competition the previous evening.

Augustus finished 2006 second to the Mercury's Diana Taurasi in scoring at 21.9 points per game, a rookie record. Only one player (Taurasi 2006), scored more points in a single season. In addition, she finished fifth in free throw percentage (.967). On August 20, Augustus was named the 2006 WNBA Rookie of the Year.

The former LSU star improved to a career-high 22.6 points per game in 2007, while shooting nearly 51% from the field. An All Star for the second straight year, Augustus finished second to Seattle's Lauren Jackson in scoring average and played in all 34 games.  The Lynx however, finished 10–24 tied with Los Angeles Sparks for the league's worst record.

2009–2010: Injuries

In June 2009, Seimone suffered a season-ending injury, a torn ACL, against the Phoenix Mercury.

Augustus's return in 2010 was derailed by medical issues as well, as she was forced to undergo surgery to remove fibroid tumors, including one the size of a golf ball. Augustus had attempted to postpone surgery until after the season, but the pain was too difficult to play through. Despite the setback, Augustus returned to play the final 25 games of the season.

2011–2018: Dynasty 
Augustus was finally back to full strength in 2011, and a part of a potent Lynx team that included a supporting cast of Lindsay Whalen, Rebekkah Brunson and newly acquired rookie Maya Moore. Augustus led the team in scoring and served as the team's lead defender as the Lynx rolled to a league best 27–7 record. Augustus also made her first all-star game since 2007. She finished eighth in MVP voting, and was named Second Team All-WNBA for the third time in her career, and the first since 2007.

Augustus elevated her game in the playoffs. She led the Lynx in scoring in five of their eight games, and scored the second-highest number of points in WNBA Finals history – 36 – in game two of the 2011 WNBA Finals. The Lynx swept the Atlanta Dream in the title round, with Augustus being unanimously named Finals MVP.

The Lynx were not a flash in the pan; they would return to the finals the next two seasons, losing to the Indiana Fever in 2012, and defeating Atlanta again in 2013. Augustus continued to earn accolades during this time. She was named first-team all-WNBA in 2012, and voted an all-star-game starter in 2013.

During the 2015 season, Augustus was named a WNBA All-Star for the sixth time in her career while averaging 13.8 points per game. However, Augustus was battling a right knee injury and was out indefinitely midway through the season to have knee surgery. The Lynx had remained dominant; making a trade for star center Sylvia Fowles, strengthening their starting lineup as they finished first place in the Western Conference with a 22–12 record. Augustus returned in time for the playoffs and The Lynx returned to the finals for a rematch against the Indiana Fever, this time with the Lynx beating Indiana in a hard-fought series, 3–2, with the newly acquired Sylvia Fowles winning Finals MVP, as the Lynx won their third WNBA championship in five years.

In the 2016 season, the Lynx continued to be a championship contender in the league, as they finished with a franchise best 28–6 record. With the WNBA's new playoff format in effect, the Lynx were the number 1 seed in the league with a double-bye to the semi-finals (the last round before the WNBA Finals) facing the Phoenix Mercury. Prior to the playoffs, Augustus had signed a multi-year contract extension with the Lynx. The Lynx defeated the Mercury in a three-game sweep, advancing to the WNBA Finals for the fifth time in six years. The Lynx were up against the Los Angeles Sparks, making it the second time in league history where two teams from the same conference faced each other in the Finals due to the new playoff format. However, the Lynx were defeated by the Sparks in five games. Also in 2016, Augustus was chosen to the WNBA Top 20@20, a list of the league's best 20 players ever in celebration of the WNBA's twentieth anniversary.

In the 2017 season, Augustus seemed to decline in scoring. She was still voted into the 2017 WNBA All-Star Game, making it her seventh all-star game appearance of her career, despite being less of a scorer she was more of a facilitator on offense, averaging a career-high in assists. On August 12, 2017, the Lynx made history as they defeated the Indiana Fever, 111–52, marking it the largest margin of victory in WNBA history; they also went on a league record 37–0 scoring run during the game. The Lynx finished with the number 1 seed yet again, with a 27–7 record, receiving a double-bye to the semi-finals. In the playoffs, Augustus stepped up on offence and scored more to be more effective for her team. In the semi-finals, the Lynx defeated the Washington Mystics in a three-game sweep, advancing to the WNBA Finals for the sixth time in seven years, setting up a rematch with the Sparks. Augustus scored a season-high 24 points in game 1 against Washington. The Lynx avenged last year's Finals loss, this time by defeating the Sparks in five games to win their fourth championship in seven seasons, tying the now-defunct Houston Comets for most championships wins.

2018–present: End of an era, departure from the Lynx
In the 2018 season, the Lynx would start showing signs of age as their days of yearly championship contention started coming to an end. They failed to get off to a hot start to the season as they were 4–6 in their first 10 games. Despite averaging a career-low in scoring, Augustus would still be voted into the 2018 WNBA All-Star Game for her eighth all-star game appearance. By the end of the season, the Lynx finished as the number 7 seed with an 18–16 record, making it the first time in 8 years that they did not finish as a top 2 seed. In the first round elimination game, the Lynx lost 75–68 to the rival Los Angeles Sparks, ending their streak of three straight finals appearances. Despite the  retirement of her longtime teammate Lindsay Whalen, Augustus re-signed with the Lynx.

In 2019, Augustus would only play in 12 games due to a nagging knee injury, she had missed the first half of the season to recover and made her return in August. The Lynx finished 18–16 with the number 7 seed but were eliminated by the Seattle Storm in the first round elimination game.

In 2020, Augustus left the Lynx after 14 seasons and signed a one-year deal with the Los Angeles Sparks. Her mother had planned events for 2020 to thank Minnesota for taking care of her daughter for so long but both mother and daughter wound up in tears. Augustus explained that she was saddened and disappointed with the tone of negotiations with the Lynx — who were all business, and who had offered her more money than L.A. Augustus would take a bench role with the Sparks. On July 25, 2020, she would make her Sparks debut, scoring 14 points in the team's 99–76 win against the Phoenix Mercury. On August 9, 2020, she scored 13 points in the team's 97–81 win against her former team. The Sparks finished 15–7 with the number 3 seed, receiving a bye to the second round. The season had been delayed and shortened to 22 games in a bubble at IMG Academy due to the COVID-19 pandemic. In the playoffs, the Sparks would come up short as they lost 73–59 to the Connecticut Sun in the second round elimination game.

In 2021, Augustus re-signed with the Sparks on a one-year deal. On May 13, 2021, she announced her retirement from play, and joined the Los Angeles Sparks coaching staff. Later that year, as part of the league's celebration of its 25th season, Augustus was named to The W25, consisting of the top 25 WNBA players of all time as chosen by a panel of media and women's basketball pioneers.

WNBA career statistics

Regular season

|-
| style="text-align:left;"| 2006
| style="text-align:left;"| Minnesota
| 34 || 34 || 33.1 || .456 || .353 || .897 || 3.8 || 1.5 || 0.6 || 0.5 || 2.0 || 21.9
|-
| style="text-align:left;"| 2007
| style="text-align:left;"| Minnesota
| 34 || 33 || 32.1 || .508 || .419 || .873 || 4.0 || 2.3 || 1.2 || 0.6 || 2.4 || 22.6
|-
| style="text-align:left;"| 2008
| style="text-align:left;"| Minnesota
| 31 || 31 || 33.6 || .470 || .317 || .890 || 3.9 || 2.7 || 1.0 || 0.4 || 1.6 || 19.1
|-
| style="text-align:left;"| 2009
| style="text-align:left;"| Minnesota
| 6 || 6 || 29.7 || .570 || .643 || .905 || 4.2 || 1.5 || 2.0 || 0.5 || 2.1 || 21.0
|-
| style="text-align:left;"| 2010
| style="text-align:left;"| Minnesota
| 25 || 25 || 33.3 || .429 || .336 || .667 || 3.2 || 1.9 || 0.7 || 0.3 || 1.4 || 16.4
|-
|style="text-align:left;background:#afe6ba;"|  2011†
| style="text-align:left;"| Minnesota
| 34 || 34 || 29.3 || .504 || .417 || .865 || 3.5 || 2.2 || 0.9 || 0.4 || 1.3 || 16.2
|-
| style="text-align:left;"| 2012
| style="text-align:left;"| Minnesota
| 29 || 29 || 29.3 || .491 || .437 || .852 || 3.6 || 2.5 || 0.9 || 0.2 || 1.7 || 16.6
|-
|style="text-align:left;background:#afe6ba;"| 2013†
| style="text-align:left;"| Minnesota
| 31 || 31 || 29.8 || .516 || .290 || .879 || 3.2 || 2.5 || 0.5 || 0.5 || 1.4 || 16.3
|-
| style="text-align:left;"| 2014
| style="text-align:left;"| Minnesota
| 24 || 24 || 31.2 || .511 || .333 || .846 || 3.6 || 2.4 || 0.4 || 0.1 || 1.6 || 16.5
|-
|style="text-align:left;background:#afe6ba;"|2015†
| style="text-align:left;"| Minnesota
| 16 || 16 || 30.1 || .440 || .130 || 1.000 || 2.9 || 2.4 || 0.5 || 0.3 || 1.2 || 13.8
|-
| style="text-align:left;"| 2016
| style="text-align:left;"| Minnesota
| 29 || 29 || 26.4 || .460 || .333 || .804 || 2.9 || 2.4 || 0.5 || 0.3 || 1.9 || 11.2
|-
|style="text-align:left;background:#afe6ba;"|2017†
| style="text-align:left;"| Minnesota
| 32 || 32 || 27.7 || .502 || .432 || .868 || 2.9 || 4.0 || 0.5 || 0.0 || 1.4 || 10.9
|-
| style="text-align:left;"| 2018
| style="text-align:left;"| Minnesota
| 33 || 33 || 26.2 || .467 || .318 || .706 || 1.8 || 2.6 || 0.4 || 0.2 || 1.2 || 10.8
|-
| style="text-align:left;"| 2019
| style="text-align:left;"| Minnesota
| 12 || 7 || 13.0 || .313 || .167 || .750 || 0.6 || 1.3 || 0.4 || 0.1 || 1.0 || 3.8
|-
| style="text-align:left;"| 2020
| style="text-align:left;"| Los Angeles
| 21 || 0 || 15.8 || .491 || .545 || .667 || 1.8 || 1.2 || 0.6 || 0.1 || 0.4 || 5.9
|-
| style="text-align:left;"| Career
| style="text-align:left;"|15 years, 2 teams
| 391 || 365 || 28.8 || .480 || .364 || .858 || 2.6 || 3.1 || 0.7 || 0.3 || 1.6 || 15.4

Postseason

|-
|style="text-align:left;background:#afe6ba;"|2011†
| style="text-align:left;"| Minnesota
| 8 || 8 || 33.0 || .527 || .438 || .886 || 4.5 || 3.8 || 0.9 || 0.6 || 1.6 || 22.0
|-
| style="text-align:left;"| 2012
| style="text-align:left;"| Minnesota
| 9 || 9 || 35.0 || .427 || .294 || .806 || 5.0 || 2.1 || 1.6 || 0.3 || 1.5 || 17.9
|-
|style="text-align:left;background:#afe6ba;"|2013†
| style="text-align:left;"| Minnesota
| 7 || 7 || 32.0 || .546 || .333 || .684 || 3.7 || 1.4 || 1.0 || 0.9 || 1.7 || 17.4
|-
| style="text-align:left;"| 2014
| style="text-align:left;"| Minnesota
| 5 || 5 || 34.2 || .443 || .250 || .833 || 3.2 || 2.4 || 1.0 || 0.2 || 1.0 || 18.6
|-
|style="text-align:left;background:#afe6ba;"| 2015†
| style="text-align:left;"| Minnesota
| 10 || 10 || 34.4 || .379 || .143 || .762 || 3.0 || 2.5 || 0.9 || 0.3 || 1.3 || 12.8
|-
| style="text-align:left;"| 2016
| style="text-align:left;"| Minnesota
| 8 || 8 || 26.9 || .393 || .250 || .870 || 2.9 || 3.3 || 0.8 || 0.2 || 2.0 || 11.1
|-
|style="text-align:left;background:#afe6ba;"| 2017†
| style="text-align:left;"| Minnesota
| 8 || 8 || 31.8|| .490 || .526 || .500 || 4.8 || 3.5 || 0.3 || 0.5 || 1.6 || 13.9
|-
| style="text-align:left;"| 2018
| style="text-align:left;"| Minnesota
| 1 || 1 || 24.0 || .286 || .000 || .500 || 3.0 || 2.0 || 0.0 || 0.0 || 1.0 || 5.0
|-
| style="text-align:left;"| 2019
| style="text-align:left;"| Minnesota
| 1 || 0 || 21.0 || .273 || .000 || .000 || 3.0 || 0.0 || 1.0 || 1.0 || 1.0 || 6.0
|-
| style="text-align:left;"| 2020
| style="text-align:left;"| Los Angeles
| 1 || 0 || 22.0 || .500 || .000 || 1.000 || 3.0 || 1.0 || 0.0 || 1.0 || 1.0 || 10.0
|-
| style="text-align:left;"| Career
| style="text-align:left;"|10 years, 2 teams
| 58 || 56 || 32.0 || .452 || .322 || .799 || 3.8 || 2.6 || 0.9 || 0.5 || 1.5 || 15.5

Overseas career
In the 2006–07 and 2007–08 WNBA off seasons, she played for the Dynamo Moscow club in Russia.

During the 2008–09 WNBA offseason, Augustus played in the EuroCup for Galatasaray, a club based in Turkey. She would once again play for Galatasaray in the 2010-11 WNBA offseason.

Since 2013, Augustus played three consecutive offseasons for Dynamo Kursk of the Russian League.

Awards and achievements
2004—Winner of the Honda Sports Award for basketball
2005—Winner of the Honda Sports Award for basketball
2007–08 Turkish Presidents Cup Winner with Galatasaray
2008–09 FIBA Eurocup Winner with Galatasaray
2008–09 FIBA Eurocup MVP with Galatasaray

International career
Augustus is a current member of the U.S. women's basketball team and she earned a gold medal at the 2008, 2012 and 2016 Summer Olympics.

Augustus was invited to the USA Basketball Women's National Team training camp in the fall of 2009. The team selected to play for the 2010 FIBA World Championship and the 2012 Olympics is usually chosen from these participants. At the conclusion of the training camp, the team traveled to Ekaterinburg, Russia, where they competed in the 2009 UMMC Ekaterinburg International Invitational. While Augustus did not go to the World Championship, she was chosen for her second Olympic tournament. Augustus was ultimately selected to the 2014 FIBA World Championship, along with Lynx teammates Moore and Whalen, and the US went on to win the gold medal.

Personal life
In April 2010, Augustus had surgery at Fairview Southdale Hospital to remove fibroids, a surgery that both her mother and grandmother had undergone. While her uterus was removed during the operation, her ovaries were left intact, making children via a gestational surrogate possible. She has said that she wants children someday. Augustus is openly lesbian. She became engaged to LaTaya Varner in 2010, and married her in Hawaii in 2015. As of October 2018, the couple divorced. Augustus is the cousin of former Mississippi State power forward, Kodi Augustus.

References

External links

Seimone Augustus official site, hosted by LSU Athletics
USA Basketball bio
Seimone's bio at usolympicteam.com
Seimone Augustus Profile Galatasaray.org
Profile at tbl.org.tr
Seimone's Story: WNBA Phenom Part 1,Part II, Part III, Part IV, Part V
WNBA 2006 Draft Prospectus
 - 14 minute video

1984 births
Living people
All-American college women's basketball players
American women's basketball players
American expatriate basketball people in Russia
American expatriate basketball people in Turkey
Basketball players at the 2008 Summer Olympics
Basketball players at the 2012 Summer Olympics
Basketball players at the 2016 Summer Olympics
Basketball players from Baton Rouge, Louisiana
Galatasaray S.K. (women's basketball) players
Lesbian sportswomen
LGBT African Americans
LGBT basketball players
LGBT people from Louisiana
American LGBT sportspeople
Los Angeles Sparks players
LSU Lady Tigers basketball players
McDonald's High School All-Americans
Medalists at the 2008 Summer Olympics
Medalists at the 2012 Summer Olympics
Medalists at the 2016 Summer Olympics
Minnesota Lynx draft picks
Minnesota Lynx players
Olympic gold medalists for the United States in basketball
Shooting guards
Women's National Basketball Association All-Stars
Women's National Basketball Association first-overall draft picks
United States women's national basketball team players